Urea Sar Karkhana School & College (USKC) is an educational institution in Narsingdi District. Urea Sar Karkhana School & College set out for 1 January 1970. It is an institution operated by Bangladesh Chemical Industries Corporation (BCIC). It is located in the Palash Upazila of Narsingdi District and inside the Colony of Urea Sar Karkhana Ltd. Boys and girls come here from very far to study. This institute has the three disciplines of science, business studies, and humanities. The Educational Institute Identification Number (EIIN) of Urea Sar Karkhana School and College is "112760".

Administration
 Principal: Md. Gausul Azam

Publications

Every year Urea Sar Karkhana School & College publishes an annual magazine called Prottasha. But some years this magazine has been stopped.

Co-curricular activities
 Sports
 Cultural activities
 Scouting
 Bangladesh National Cadet Corps

External links
 

Schools in Narsingdi District
Colleges in Narsingdi District
Universities and colleges in Dhaka
Educational institutions established in 1970
1970 establishments in Asia
Palash Upazila